In the mathematical field of differential geometry a Liouville surface is a type of surface which in local coordinates may be written as a graph in R3

such that the first fundamental form is of the form

Sometimes a metric of this form is called a Liouville metric.  Every surface of revolution is a Liouville surface.

References
  (Translated from the Russian by R. Silverman.)
 

Surfaces